The 1991 Pyroil 500 was the 28th and penultimate stock car race of the 1991 NASCAR Winston Cup Series season, the ninth and the final race of the 1991 NASCAR Winston West Series season, and the fourth iteration of the event. The race was held on Sunday, November 3, 1991, in Avondale, Arizona at Phoenix International Raceway, a 1-mile (1.6 km) permanent low-banked tri-oval race track. The race took the scheduled 312 laps to complete. At race's end, Robert Yates Racing driver Davey Allison would manage to dominate the late stages of the race, leading 162 of the final 166 laps of the race to take his 13th career NASCAR Winston Cup Series victory and his fifth and final victory of the season. To fill out the top three, owner-driver Darrell Waltrip and Junior Johnson & Associates driver Sterling Marlin would finish second and third, respectively.

In the driver's championship for the 1991 NASCAR Winston Cup Series, Richard Childress Racing driver Dale Earnhardt was considered the extremely heavy favorite to win the championship, only needing to start the next race, the 1991 Hardee's 500, to win the championship.

Background 
In the driver's championship for the 1991 NASCAR Winston West Series

Phoenix International Raceway – also known as PIR – is a one-mile, low-banked tri-oval race track located in Avondale, Arizona. It is named after the nearby metropolitan area of Phoenix. The motorsport track opened in 1964 and currently hosts two NASCAR race weekends annually. PIR has also hosted the IndyCar Series, CART, USAC and the Rolex Sports Car Series. The raceway is currently owned and operated by International Speedway Corporation.

The raceway was originally constructed with a 2.5 mi (4.0 km) road course that ran both inside and outside of the main tri-oval. In 1991 the track was reconfigured with the current 1.51 mi (2.43 km) interior layout. PIR has an estimated grandstand seating capacity of around 67,000. Lights were installed around the track in 2004 following the addition of a second annual NASCAR race weekend.

Entry list 

 (R) denotes rookie driver.

Qualifying 
Qualifying was split into two rounds. The first round was held on Friday, November 1, at 5:30 PM EST. Each driver would have one lap to set a time. During the first round, the top 20 drivers in the round would be guaranteed a starting spot in the race. If a driver was not able to guarantee a spot in the first round, they had the option to scrub their time from the first round and try and run a faster lap time in a second round qualifying run, held on Saturday, November 2, at 2:00 PM EST. As with the first round, each driver would have one lap to set a time. For this specific race, positions 21-40 would be decided on time, and depending on who needed it, a select amount of positions were given to cars who had not otherwise qualified but were high enough in owner's points; which was one for cars in the NASCAR Winston Cup Series and two extra provisionals for the NASCAR Winston West Series. If needed, a past champion who did not qualify on either time or provisionals could use a champion's provisional, adding one more spot to the field.

14 drivers would fail to qualify.

Full qualifying results

Race results

Standings after the race 

Drivers' Championship standings

Note: Only the first 10 positions are included for the driver standings.

References 

1991 NASCAR Winston Cup Series
NASCAR races at Phoenix Raceway
November 1991 sports events in the United States
1991 in sports in Arizona